Role-playing game creation software is a game creation system (software program) intended to make it easy for non-programmers to create a role-playing video game. The target audience for most of these products is artists and creative types who have the imaginative abilities to assemble the elements of a game (artwork, plotline, music, etc.) but lack the technical skill to program it themselves.

RPG Maker

The most famous RPG maker is the commercial Japanese RPG Maker series that has been released since 1988 for many systems ranging from the PC-8801, MSX, PC-9801, and Microsoft Windows, to the Super Famicom, PlayStation, Game Boy Color, PlayStation 2, and Cellphones.

Other role-playing game creation software

While not an RPG maker per se, the Worldforge game engine is intended  for creating MMORPGs.

References

Video game development software